Sheldon Marks is an American urologist and writer who is the founder of the International Center for Vasectomy Reversal (ICVR). He is a clinical professor at the University of Arizona College of Medicine and Assistant Professor of Urology at New England Medical Center, Tufts University.

He is also a diplomate of the American Board of Urology.

He is also known for Marks Vas Cutting Forceps.

Early life and career
Marks was educated at the Occidental College. He received his medical education from the University of Arizona College of Medicine.

He received his general surgery training at the Mayo Clinic in Rochester, Minnesota where his interest in urology and microscopic surgeries developed.

He has also served as the chief resident in urology at Tufts University School of Medicine.

In 1993, he founded the International Center for Vasectomy Reversal (ICVR) to perform vasectomy reversals.

Bibliography

Books

Select Publications
 David J. Nusbaum, Sheldon F. Marks, Matthew B.F. Marks, Peter J. Burrows, Robert Zollman, Mary K. Samplaski. The Effect of Male Age Over 50 Years on Vasectomy Reversal Outcomes. Urology, 2020

References

External links
 

Living people
American urologists
Year of birth missing (living people)